Hydriastele wendlandiana, commonly known as Wendland's palm, cat o' nine tails, creek palm or kentia palm, is a tall, multi-stemmed tree in the palm family Arecaceae. It is native to New Guinea and the Australian states of  Queensland and the Northern Territory.

Description
The apical leaflets are merged at the base and are much broader than the rest.

The species is monoecious, that is, it has both staminate (functionally male) and pistillate (functionally female) flowers on the one plant. The spikes are initially erect but become pendulous as the fruit develops. The flowers are arranged in groups of 3, with two staminate flowers either side of a pistillate flower.

The fruits may be orange, purple or various shades of red.

Taxonomy
The species was first described as Kentia wendlandiana in 1870 by the German-Australian botanist Ferdinand von Mueller in his work Fragmenta Phytographiae Australiae. Very shortly after, in 1875, it was renamed Hydriastele wendlandiana by Hermann Wendland and Oscar Drude, who erected the genus Hydriastele in the journal Linnaea.

Etymology
The genus name Hydriastele derives from the Ancient Greek ὑδρο- (hudro-), meaning water, and στήλη (stḗlē), meaning column. It refers to the plant's preference for growing in or near swamps.

The species epithet wendlandiana is in honour of the German botanist Hermann Wendland who was a noted authority on Arecaceae.

Distribution and habitat

Ecology
Fruits of Wendland's plam are eaten by fruit doves, metallic starlings and cassowaries.

Gallery

References

External links

 See a map of recorded sitings of Hydriastele wendlandiana at the Australasian Virtual Herbarium

Flora of Queensland
Flora of the Northern Territory
Flora of New Guinea
Areceae
Taxa named by Ferdinand von Mueller